Jean Pradel (29 October 1933 – 12 July 2021) was a French jurist, magistrate, and professor. He specialized in criminal law.

Biography
Pradel studied at the Faculty of Law at the University of Poitiers from 1951 to 1957 and subsequently passed the entrance exam for the French National School for the Judiciary. In 1962, he became a Deputy  and a military prosecutor in Nemours.

In 1970, Pradel became an associate lecturer at the Faculty of Law of Tunis University before returning to his alma mater, the Faculty of Law of Poitiers, in 1972 as a professor. He retired in 2003. While at Poitiers, he directed the institute of judicial studies and the institute of criminal sciences. In 2000, he became a professor of criminal studies at the Institut catholique d'études supérieures in La Roche-sur-Yon.

Jean Pradel died on 12 July 2021 at the age of 87.

References

1933 births
2021 deaths
French jurists
French educators
French military personnel of the Algerian War
University of Poitiers alumni
Academic staff of Tunis University
Academic staff of the Institut catholique d'études supérieures
People from Châtellerault